Early general elections were held in the Ottoman Empire in April 1912. Due to electoral fraud and brutal electioneering, which earned the elections the nickname Sopalı Seçimler ("Election of Clubs"), the ruling Committee of Union and Progress won 269 of the 275 seats in the Chamber of Deputies, whilst the opposition Liberal Entente (also known as the Freedom and Accord Party or the Liberal Union) only won six seats.

Background
The elections were announced in January 1912, after the CUP lost a by-election to the Entente in Istanbul in December 1911. The CUP had hoped early elections would thwart the efforts of the Entente to better organise itself. The CUP platform represented centralist tendencies, whilst the Entente promoted a more decentralised agenda, including supporting allowing education in local languages.

Campaign

Although the two main parties competing in the election, the Committee of Union and Progress (CUP) and the Liberal Entente, were largely secular in their political outlook, issues such as the Islamic religious piety of their candidates became sensationalised campaign topics. Seeing the potent amount of political capital to be gained by appealing to religion, as the Muslim vote was the most important in the Empire, both parties consistently accused one another of various other supposed offenses against Islamic tradition.

Entente members accused the CUP candidates of a "disregard for Islamic principles and values" and of "attempting to restrict the prerogatives of the sultan-caliph", despite the fact that many Entente members were quite progressive in their own lives and dealings. In return, the CUP, seeing that its previous policy of secular Ottomanism (Ottoman nationalism) was failing, turned to a similar line of Islamist rhetoric as the Entente in order to drum up support among the Muslims of the Empire; it accused the Entente of "weakening Islam and Muslims" by trying to separate the Ottoman sultan's office from the Caliphate. Although this accusation was almost identical to the one leveled by the Entente at the CUP itself, it was highly effective. The Entente retorted by claiming that the CUP, in its previous attempt to amend the constitution, was covertly trying to "denounce" and abolish the ritual fasting during the month of Ramadan and the five daily prayers.

Aftermath
The manner of the CUP's victory led to the formation of the Savior Officers, whose aim was to restore constitutional government. After gaining support from the army in Macedonia, the Officers demanded government reforms. Under pressure, the Grand Vizier Mehmed Said Pasha resigned. Sultan Mehmed V then appointed a new cabinet supported by the Officers and the Entente. On 5 August 1912, Mehmed V called for early elections. However, with the election underway in October, the outbreak of the Balkan Wars led to it being interrupted. Fresh elections were eventually held in 1914.

The CUP went to the polls in an electoral alliance with the Armenian Revolutionary Federation, but the alliance broke down after only 10 of its 23 candidates won seats due to a lack of support from the CUP.

See also
4th Chamber of Deputies of the Ottoman Empire

References

Ottoman Empire
Ottoman Empire
Elections in the Ottoman Empire
1912 in the Ottoman Empire